The Ghana telephone numbering plan is the system used for assigning telephone numbers in Ghana. It is regulated by the National Communications Authority, which holds responsibility for telecommunications.

Since 1 May 2010, all fixed-line numbers and mobile numbers have 9 national (significant) numbers after the '0' trunk code.

Fixed-line numbering plan

Mobile numbering plan
Due to the unreliability of fixed-line infrastructure in Ghana, mobile phones are more widely used.  Competition among the various mobile carriers has spurred growth with a subscriber penetration rate of 98% in 2010.  The poor call quality of mobile phones, however, means that more people hold more than one mobile phone, usually with two or more different carriers.

The various mobile carriers in Ghana have each been assigned a network code.

Emergency numbers

See also 
 Telecommunications in Ghana

References

External links
 Ghana city calling codes - accessed 26 April 2010

Ghana
Telecommunications in Ghana
Telephone numbers